This was the first edition of the tournament.

Cedrik-Marcel Stebe won the title after defeating Liam Broady 6–4, 6–4 in the final.

Seeds

Draw

Finals

Top half

Bottom half

References

External links
Main draw
Qualifying draw

Internazionali di Tennis Città di Parma - Singles